Tsito is a town in the Volta Region of Ghana.

Tsito means 'by water' or 'by the river' In the Eʋe language. It is also a settlement discovered after a migratory exploit of its founders, when they were trying to erect a police post for the paramountcy of Awudome traditional area. There are 2 secondary schools in Tsito.

References

Populated places in the Volta Region